Chamuakpet Hapalang (born: August 10, 1962 in Amphoe Si Racha, Chonburi province, eastern Thailand) is a retired Thai Muay Thai fighter who won five different weight classes, was champion of the Lumpinee Stadium and the Rajadamnern Stadium and was also a professional boxer. He fought in the early 80s-the mid 90s. He had a southpaw stance and was best known for his powerful and precise knee strikes which made him receive the nickname "Computer Knee Striker".

Biography and career
Chamuakpetch (nicknamed: Chean; เชียร) starting fighting at the age of 13 in his local neighbourhood. Then he traveled along with his older brother to Bangkok, and made his debut at the Rajadamnern Stadium in late 1978. Soon afterwards, he won his first title in the Pinweight division by defeating Samart Payakaroon in a points decision in 1980.

He fought with many top-line Thai fighters such as Jampatong Na Nontachai, Samransak Muangsurin, Manasak Sor Ploenchit, Chanchai Sor Tamarangsri, Oley Kiatoneway, Jaroenthong Kiatbanchong, Langsuan Panyuthaphum, Wanwiset  Kaennorsing, Wangchannoi Sor Palangchai, Paluhadlek Sitchunthong, Paidang Lersak Gym, Yodkhuntap Sitkrupat, Kangwannoi A.Sribouloy, Prabsuk Sitsantad, Padejsuk Kiatsamran, Suwitlek Sor Sakaorat, Jack Kiatniwat and he also beat Samart's older brother, Kongtoranee Payakaroon. In addition, he also fought several foreign fighters. In his fight against Langsuan Panyuthaphum on the evening of March 4, 1988 at Rajadamnern Stadium, his manager Chaiwat "Ngow Haphalung" Phalungwattanakit was shot dead while watching him fight in the stadium.

In 1996 he switched to professional status within Niwat "Chae-mae" Laosuwanwat's stable; he won the PABA Featherweight title and he retained it five times before retiring in 2000 due to his age.

After retirement he became a Muay Thai trainer in Japan along with many other former fellow fighters. He fought in Muay Thai style for round about 200 times.

Titles and honour

Muay Thai
Lumpinee Stadium
 1980 Lumpinee Stadium Pinweight (102 lbs) Champion (one defense)
 1981 Lumpinee Stadium Light Flyweight (108 lbs) Champion
 1982 Lumpinee Stadium Flyweight (112 lbs) Champion 
 1983 Lumpinee Stadium Bantamweight (118 lbs) Champion

Rajadamnern Stadium
 1980 Rajadamnern Stadium Mini flyweight (104 lbs) Champion (one defense)
 1989 Rajadamnern Stadium Junior featherweight (122 lbs) Champion
 1990 Rajadamnern Stadium Featherweight (126 lbs) Champion
 1994 Rajadamnern Stadium Junior featherweight (122 lbs) Champion
 1994 Rajadamnern Stadium Featherweight (126 lbs) Champion

Sports Writers Association of Thailand
 1985 Fighter of the Year 
 1994 Fight of the Year (vs Chaidet Kiatcharnsing)

Professional boxing
1997 PABA Featherweight Champion (126 lbs)

Fight record

|-  style="background:#cfc;"
| 2000-03-19|| Win ||align=left| Kensaku Maeda || K-1 Burning 2000 ||  Yokohama, Japan || Decision (Unanimous) || 5 || 3:00
|-  style="background:#cfc;"
| 1998-11-14|| Win ||align=left| Takehiro Murahama || Shootboxing GROUND ZERO TOKYO ||  Tokyo, Japan || Decision (Unanimous) || 5 || 3:00

|-  style="background:#fbb;"
| 1996-|| Loss ||align=left| Chutin Por.Tawatchai || Rajadamnern Stadium || Bangkok, Thailand || Decision || 5 || 3:00
|-  style="background:#fbb;"
| 1996-02-21|| Loss ||align=left| Chaidet Kietkangsing || || Bangkok, Thailand || Decision || 5 || 3:00
|-  style="background:#cfc;"
| 1996-01-27|| Win ||align=left| Takehiro Murahama || Shootboxing GROUND ZERO YOKOHAMA ||  Yokohama, Japan || Decision (Split) || 5 || 3:00

|-  style="background:#cfc;"
| 1995-12-27|| Win ||align=left| Komkiat Sor.Thanikul || Rajadamnern Stadium || Bangkok, Thailand || Decision || 5 || 3:00

|-  style="background:#fbb;"
| 1995-11-08|| Loss||align=left| Chaidet Kiatchangsing || Rajadamnern Stadium || Bangkok, Thailand || Decision || 5 || 3:00

|-  style="background:#cfc;"
| 1995-09-27|| Win||align=left| Patpon Dejruta || Rajadamnern Stadium || Bangkok, Thailand || Decision || 5 || 3:00

|-  style="background:#c5d2ea;"
| 1995-08-30|| Draw||align=left| Patpon Dejruta ||  Rajadamnern Stadium || Bangkok, Thailand || Decision || 5 || 3:00
|-  style="background:#cfc;"
| 1995-08-07|| Win ||align=left| Komkiat Sor.Thanikul || Rajadamnern Stadium || Bangkok, Thailand || Decision || 5 || 3:00

|-  style="background:#cfc;"
| 1995-07-17|| Win ||align=left| Banleudet Lookprabaht || Rajadamnern Stadium || Bangkok, Thailand || KO (Right uppercut) || 2 || 

|-  style="background:#fbb;"
| 1995-04-26|| Loss ||align=left| Prabseuk Sitsantat || Rajadamnern Stadium || Bangkok, Thailand || Decision || 5 || 3:00
|-  style="background:#cfc;"
| 1995-04-05|| Win ||align=left| Banleudet Lookprabaht || Rajadamnern Stadium || Bangkok, Thailand || Decision || 5 || 3:00

|-  style="background:#cfc;"
| 1995-03-15|| Win ||align=left| Boonlong Sor.Thanikul || Rajadamnern Stadium || Bangkok, Thailand || Decision || 5 || 3:00

|-  style="background:#cfc;"
| 1995-02-22|| Win ||align=left| Yutahat Sor Narongchai || Rajadamnern Stadium || Bangkok, Thailand || Decision || 5 || 3:00
|-  style="background:#cfc;"
| 1995-01-07|| Win ||align=left| Atsushi Tateshima || AJKF CHALLENGER I ||  Tokyo, Japan || Decision (Unanimous) || 5 || 3:00
|-  style="background:#fbb;"
| 1994-12-21|| Loss ||align=left| Samingnoi Sor Thanikul || Rajadamnern Stadium || Bangkok, Thailand || Decision || 5 || 3:00
|-
! style=background:white colspan=9 |
|-  style="background:#fbb;"
| 1994-11-23|| Loss ||align=left| Samingnoi Sor Thanikul || Rajadamnern Stadium || Bangkok, Thailand || Decision || 5 || 3:00
|-  style="background:#fbb;"
| 1994-10-31|| Loss ||align=left| Prabseuk Sitsantat || Rajadamnern Stadium || Bangkok, Thailand || Decision || 5 || 3:00
|-  style="background:#cfc;"
| 1994-09-07|| Win ||align=left| Chaidet Kiatchangsing || Rajadamnern Stadium || Bangkok, Thailand || Decision || 5 || 3:00
|-  style="background:#cfc;"
| 1994-07-27|| Win ||align=left| Chaidet Kiatchangsing || Rajadamnern Stadium || Bangkok, Thailand || KO || 3 ||  
|-
! style=background:white colspan=9 |

|-  style="background:#cfc;"
| 1994-06-27|| Win ||align=left| Prabseuk Sitsantat || Rajadamnern Stadium || Bangkok, Thailand || Decision || 5 || 3:00

|-  style="background:#cfc;"
| 1994-06-08|| Win ||align=left| Muangfahlek Kiatvichian || Rajadamnern Stadium || Bangkok, Thailand || Decision || 5 || 3:00

|-  style="background:#fbb;"
| 1994-04-27|| Loss ||align=left| Silapathai Jockygym || Rajadamnern Stadium || Bangkok, Thailand || Decision || 5 || 3:00
|-
! style=background:white colspan=9 |

|-  style="background:#cfc;"
| 1994-03-30|| Win ||align=left| Paideang Lersakgym || Rajadamnern Stadium || Bangkok, Thailand || Decision || 5 || 3:00 
|-
! style=background:white colspan=9 |

|-  style="background:#fbb;"
| 1994-02-23|| Loss||align=left| Wanghin Por.Chaiwat || Rajadamnern Stadium || Bangkok, Thailand || Decision || 5 || 3:00

|-  style="background:#fbb;"
| 1994-01-26|| Loss||align=left| Banluedet Lukprabat || Rajadamnern Stadium || Bangkok, Thailand || Decision || 5 || 3:00

|-  style="background:#cfc;"
| 1993-12-22|| Win ||align=left| Singnoi Sor.Prasartporn|| Rajadamnern Stadium || Bangkok, Thailand || Decision || 5 || 3:00
|-  style="background:#;"
| 1993-10-27|| ||align=left|  Tahanek Pichitman || || Bangkok, Thailand || ||  ||
|-  style="background:#;"
| 1993-09-23|| ||align=left| Wanwiset Kaennorasing || Rajadamnern Stadium || Bangkok, Thailand || ||  ||
|-  style="background:#cfc;"
| 1993-07-31|| Win ||align=left| Kukrit Sor.Nayayarm|| Omnoi Stadium ||  Thailand || Decision || 5 || 3:00

|-  style="background:#fbb;"
| 1993-05-21|| Loss ||align=left| Oley Kiatoneway || Lumpinee Stadium || Bangkok, Thailand || Decision || 5 || 3:00
|-  style="background:#fbb;"
| 1993-04-28|| Loss ||align=left| Kanongmek Sitsei || Rajadamnern Stadium || Bangkok, Thailand || Decision || 5 ||3:00
|-  style="background:#fbb;"
| 1993-03-23|| Loss||align=left| Oley Kiatoneway || Lumpinee Stadium || Bangkok, Thailand || Decision || 5 || 3:00
|-  style="background:#fbb;"
| 1993-01-26|| Loss ||align=left| Buakaw Por Pisitchet  || Rajadamnern Stadium || Bangkok, Thailand || Decision || 5 || 3:00
|-  style="background:#fbb;"
| 1992-12-30|| Loss ||align=left| Boonlai Sor.Thanikul  || Rajadamnern Stadium || Bangkok, Thailand || Decision || 5 || 3:00
|-  style="background:#cfc;"
| 1992-12-05|| Win ||align=left| Oley Kiatoneway || Lumpinee Stadium, King's Birthday || Bangkok, Thailand || KO (Punches)|| 4 ||
|-  style="background:#fbb;"
| 1992-11-16|| Loss ||align=left| Pepsi Biyapan  || Rajadamnern Stadium || Bangkok, Thailand || Decision || 5 || 3:00
|-  style="background:#cfc;"
| 1992-10-20|| Win||align=left| Pepsi Biyapan  || Lumpinee Stadium || Bangkok, Thailand || Decision || 5 || 3:00
|-  style="background:#cfc;"
| 1992-09-30|| Win ||align=left| Taweechai Wor Preecha || Rajadamnern Stadium || Bangkok, Thailand || Decision || 5 || 3:00
|-  style="background:#cfc;"
| 1992-03-11|| Win||align=left| Yodkhuntap Sitkrupatt || Rajadamnern Stadium || Bangkok, Thailand || Decision || 5 || 3:00
|-  style="background:#fbb;"
| 1992-01-27|| Loss||align=left| Pimaranlek Sitaran || Rajadamnern Stadium || Bangkok, Thailand || Decision || 5 || 3:00
|-  style="background:#fbb;"
| 1991-11-13|| Loss||align=left| Yodkhuntap Sitkrupatt || Rajadamnern Stadium || Bangkok, Thailand || Decision || 5 || 3:00

|-  style="background:#fbb;"
| 1991-09-28|| Loss||align=left| Padejsuk Kiatsamran || Rajadamnern Stadium || Bangkok, Thailand || Decision || 5 || 3:00
|-  style="background:#c5d2ea;"
| 1991-08-28|| Draw||align=left| Padejseuk Kiatsamran || Rajadamnern Stadium || Bangkok, Thailand || Decision || 5 || 3:00
|-  style="background:#fbb;"
| 1991-07-20|| Loss ||align=left| Rajasak Sor.Vorapin || Crocodile Farm, Khaosai vs Griman || Samut Prakan, Thailand || Decision (Unanimous) || 5 || 3:00 
|-
! style=background:white colspan=9 |
|-  style="background:#fbb;"
| 1991-06-26|| Loss ||align=left| Padphon Dejrittha || Rajadamnern Stadium || Bangkok, Thailand || Decision || 5 || 3:00
|-  style="background:#fbb;"
| 1991-05-|| Win||align=left| Tahaneak Praeaumpol || Rajadamnern Stadium || Bangkok, Thailand || Decision || 5 || 3:00
|-  style="background:#cfc;"
| 1990-12-09|| Win ||align=left| Jack Kiatniwat||  || Phetchabun Province, Thailand || Decision || 5 || 3:00
|-  style="background:#cfc;"
| 1990-11-30|| Win ||align=left| Sangtiennoi Sor.Rungroj || Rajadamnern Stadium || Bangkok, Thailand || Decision || 5 || 3:00
|-  style="background:#cfc;"
| 1990-10-31|| Win ||align=left| Jack Kiatniwat|| Rajadamnern Stadium || Bangkok, Thailand || Decision || 5 || 3:00 
|-
! style=background:white colspan=9 |
|-  style="background:#cfc;"
| 1990-09-28|| Win ||align=left| Takahiro Shimizu || AJKF INSPIRING WARS HEAT-928 ||  Tokyo, Japan || Decision (Unanimous) || 5 || 3:00
|-  style="background:#cfc;"
| 1990-05-30|| Win||align=left| Sangtiennoi Sor.Rungroj|| Rajadamnern Stadium || Bangkok, Thailand || Decision || 5 || 3:00
|-  style="background:#cfc;"
| 1990-03-29|| Win ||align=left| Jack Kiatniwat|| Rajadamnern Stadium || Bangkok, Thailand || Decision || 5 || 3:00 
|-
! style=background:white colspan=9 |
|-  style="background:#fbb;"
| 1990-01-29|| Loss ||align=left| Jack Kiatniwat|| Rajadamnern Stadium || Bangkok, Thailand || Decision || 5 || 3:00 
|-
! style=background:white colspan=9 |
|-  style="background:#c5d2ea;"
| 1989-12-06|| Draw ||align=left| Jack Kiatniwat|| Rajadamnern Stadium || Bangkok, Thailand || Decision || 5 || 3:00
|-  style="background:#cfc;"
| 1989-10-18|| Win ||align=left| Jack Kiatniwat|| Rajadamnern Stadium || Bangkok, Thailand || Decision || 5 || 3:00
|-  style="background:#cfc;"
| 1989-06-05|| Win ||align=left| Sangtiennoi Sor.Rungroj || Rajadamnern Stadium || Bangkok, Thailand || Decision || 5 || 3:00
|-  style="background:#c5d2ea;"
| 1989-04-24|| Draw ||align=left| Sangtiennoi Sor.Rungroj || Rajadamnern Stadium || Bangkok, Thailand || Decision || 5 || 3:00
|-  style="background:#cfc;"
| 1989-02-22|| Win ||align=left| Wanpichit Kaennorasing || Lumpinee Stadium || Bangkok, Thailand || Decision || 5 || 3:00 
|-
! style=background:white colspan=9 |
|-  style="background:#cfc;"
| 1988-11-25|| Win ||align=left| Felipe Garcia ||  || Las Vegas, United States || KO (Left High Kick)|| 3 ||
|-  style="background:#fbb;"
| 1988-10-11|| Loss ||align=left| Wangchannoi Sor Palangchai || Lumpinee Stadium || Bangkok, Thailand || Decision || 5 || 3:00
|-  style="background:#fbb;"
| 1988-07-18|| Loss ||align=left| Jaroenthong Kiatbanchong || Rajadamnern Stadium || Bangkok, Thailand || Decision || 5 || 3:00
|-  style="background:#cfc;"
| 1988-05-03|| Win ||align=left| Langsuan Panyuthaphum || Lumpinee Stadium || Bangkok, Thailand || Decision || 5 || 3:00
|-  style="background:#c5d2ea;"
| 1988-03-04|| NC ||align=left| Langsuan Panyuthaphum || Lumpinee Stadium || Bangkok, Thailand || No Contest (gunshots in the stadium) || 4 || 3:00
|-  style="background:#cfc;"
| 1987-10-27|| Win ||align=left| Manasak Sor Ploenchit || Rajadamnern Stadium || Bangkok, Thailand || Decision || 5 || 3:00
|-  style="background:#cfc;"
| 1987-07-31|| Win ||align=left| Samransak Muangsurin || Lumpinee Stadium || Bangkok, Thailand || Decision || 5 || 3:00
|-  style="background:#cfc;"
| 1987-05-19|| Win||align=left| Chanchai Sor Tamarangsri || Lumpinee Stadium || Bangkok, Thailand || Decision || 5 || 3:00

|-  style="background:#fbb;"
| 1987-03-31|| Loss ||align=left| Saencherng Pinsinchai || Lumpinee Stadium || Bangkok, Thailand || Decision || 5 || 3:00
|-  style="background:#cfc;"
| 1986-11-11|| Win ||align=left| Sangtiennoi Sor.Rungroj || Lumpinee Stadium || Bangkok, Thailand || Decision || 5 || 3:00
|-  style="background:#cfc;"
| 1986-08-11|| Win ||align=left| Jampatong Na Nontachai || Rajadamnern Stadium || Bangkok, Thailand || Decision || 5 || 3:00
|-  style="background:#fbb;"
| 1986-06-12|| Loss ||align=left| Jampatong Na Nontachai || Rajadamnern Stadium || Bangkok, Thailand || KO (high kick) || 2 ||
|-  style="background:#cfc;"
| 1985-10-24|| Win ||align=left| Manasak Sor Ploenchit || Rajadamnern Stadium || Bangkok, Thailand || Decision || 5 || 3:00
|-  style="background:#cfc;"
| 1985-09-03|| Win ||align=left| Samransak Muangsurin || Lumpinee Stadium || Bangkok, Thailand || Decision || 5 || 3:00

|-  style="background:#cfc;"
| 1985-07-26 || Win||align=left| Maewnoi Sitchang || Lumpinee Stadium || Bangkok, Thailand || Decision || 5 || 3:00
|-  style="background:#cfc;"
| 1985- || Win||align=left| Boonam Sor.Jaranee ||  || Bangkok, Thailand || Decision || 5 || 3:00
|-  style="background:#cfc;"
| 1984-11-20|| Win||align=left| Chanchai Sor.Kiatdisak || Lumpinee Stadium || Bangkok, Thailand || Decision || 5 || 3:00
|-  style="background:#fbb;"
| 1984-10-18|| Loss||align=left| Payanoi Sor.Tatsanee || Lumpinee Stadium || Bangkok, Thailand || Decision || 5 || 3:00 
|-
! style=background:white colspan=9 |
|-  style="background:#cfc;"
| 1984-09-14|| Win||align=left| Chanchai Sor.Kiatdisak || Lumpinee Stadium || Bangkok, Thailand || Decision || 5 || 3:00
|-  style="background:#fbb;"
| 1984-07-10|| Loss ||align=left| Saencherng Naruepai || Lumpinee Stadium || Bangkok, Thailand || Decision || 5 || 3:00

|-  style="background:#fbb;"
| 1984-04-10|| Loss ||align=left| Samransak Muangsurin || Lumpinee Stadium || Bangkok, Thailand || KO (Punches) || 2 ||

|-  style="background:#fbb;"
| 1984-01-31|| Loss ||align=left| Kongtoranee Payakaroon || Lumpinee Stadium || Bangkok, Thailand || Decision || 5 || 3:00 
|-
! style=background:white colspan=9 |

|-  style="background:#fbb;"
| 1983-11-11 || Loss||align=left| Samart Payakaroon || Lumpinee Stadium || Bangkok, Thailand || Decision || 5 || 3:00
|-  style="background:#cfc;"
| 1983-08-26|| Win ||align=left| Sornslip Sitnoenpayoon || Lumpinee Stadium || Bangkok, Thailand || Decision || 5 || 3:00 
|-
! style=background:white colspan=9 |
|-  style="background:#cfc;"
| 1983-05-10|| Win||align=left| Samransak Muangsurin || Lumpinee Stadium || Bangkok, Thailand || Decision || 5 || 3:00

|-  style="background:#cfc;"
| 1983-03-05|| Win||align=left| Mafuang Weerapol ||  || Chiang Mai, Thailand || Decision || 5 || 3:00

|-  style="background:#cfc;"
| 1982-12-24 || Win||align=left| Panmongkon Hor. Mahachai || Rajadamnern Stadium || Bangkok, Thailand || Decision || 5 || 3:00
|-  style="background:#cfc;"
| 1982-11-15|| Win ||align=left| Piyarat Sor. Narongmit || Lumpinee Stadium || Bangkok, Thailand || Decision || 5 || 3:00

|-  style="background:#cfc;"
| 1982-09-23|| Win||align=left| Panmongkon Hor. Mahachai || Rajadamnern Stadium || Bangkok, Thailand || Decision || 5 || 3:00
|-  style="background:#cfc;"
| 1982-06-22|| Win ||align=left| Kongtoranee Payakaroon || Lumpinee Stadium || Bangkok, Thailand || Decision || 5 || 3:00 
|-
! style=background:white colspan=9 |
|-  style="background:#cfc;"
| 1982-05-10|| Win||align=left| Fahkamram Sitpontep || Rajadamnern Stadium || Bangkok, Thailand || Decision || 5 || 3:00
|-  style="background:#fbb;"
| 1982-03-12|| Loss||align=left| Kongtoranee Payakaroon || Lumpinee Stadium || Bangkok, Thailand || Decision || 5 || 3:00 
|-
! style=background:white colspan=9 |
|-  style="background:#cfc;"
| 1982-02-09|| Win||align=left| Wanmai Petchbandit || Lumpinee Stadium || Bangkok, Thailand || Decision || 5 || 3:00
|-  style="background:#fbb;"
| 1982-01-15|| Loss ||align=left| Wanmai Petchbandit || Lumpinee Stadium || Bangkok, Thailand || Decision || 5 || 3:00
|-  style="background:#cfc;"
| 1981-12-04|| Win ||align=left| Wisanupon Saksamut || Lumpinee Stadium || Bangkok, Thailand || Decision || 5 || 3:00
|-  style="background:#cfc;"
| 1981-10-23|| Win ||align=left| Narak Sipkraysi || Lumpinee Stadium || Bangkok, Thailand || Decision || 5 || 3:00 
|-
! style=background:white colspan=9 |
|-  style="background:#cfc;"
| 1981-09-04|| Win ||align=left| Wisanupon Saksamut || Lumpinee Stadium || Bangkok, Thailand || Decision || 5 || 3:00
|-  style="background:#cfc;"
| 1981-07-23|| Win ||align=left| Lankrung Kiatkriankgrai || Rajadamnern Stadium || Bangkok, Thailand || Decision || 5 || 3:00
|-
! style=background:white colspan=9 |
|-  style="background:#cfc;"
| 1981-03-25|| Win ||align=left| Lankrung Kiatkriankgrai || Rajadamnern Stadium || Bangkok, Thailand || Decision || 5 || 3:00
|-  style="background:#fbb;"
| 1981-01-09|| Loss||align=left| Rungchai Thairungruang|| Lumpinee Stadium || Bangkok, Thailand || Decision || 5 || 3:00 
|-
! style=background:white colspan=9 |
|-  style="background:#fbb;"
| 1980-12-02|| Loss ||align=left| Samart Payakaroon || Lumpinee Stadium || Bangkok, Thailand || Decision || 5 || 3:00
|-  style="background:#cfc;"
| 1980-10-29|| Win ||align=left| Kiophit Chuwattana|| Rajadamnern Stadium || Bangkok, Thailand || Decision || 5 || 3:00 
|-
! style=background:white colspan=9 |
|-  style="background:#cfc;"
| 1980-09-23|| Win||align=left| Paruhatlek Sitchunthong || Lumpinee Stadium || Bangkok, Thailand || Decision || 5 || 3:00  
|-
! style=background:white colspan=9 |
|-  style="background:#cfc;"
| 1980-08-08|| Win ||align=left| Samart Payakaroon || Lumpinee Stadium || Bangkok, Thailand || Decision || 5 || 3:00 
|-
! style=background:white colspan=9 |
|-  style="background:#cfc;"
| 1980-06-28|| Win||align=left| Paruhatlek Sitchunthong || Lumpinee Stadium || Bangkok, Thailand || Decision || 5 || 3:00
|-  style="background:#cfc;"
| 1980-06-06|| Win ||align=left| Narak Sitkraisi ||  || Bangkok, Thailand || Decision ||5  ||3:00
|-  style="background:#cfc;"
| 1980-04-29|| Win ||align=left| Mekhha Worawut ||  || Bangkok, Thailand || Decision ||5  ||3:00
|-  style="background:#cfc;"
| 1980-02-22|| Win ||align=left| Banluesak Wor.Tangchitjaroen ||  || Bangkok, Thailand || Decision ||5  ||3:00
|-  style="background:#fbb;"
| 1980-01-01|| Loss ||align=left| Banluesak Wor.Tangchitjaroen ||  || Bangkok, Thailand || Decision ||5  ||3:00

|-  style="text-align:center; background:#cfc;"
| 1979-11-09|| Win ||align=left| Kiewannoi Kiatmonsawan || Lumpinee Stadium || Bangkok, Thailand || Decision|| 5 ||3:00

|-  style="background:#cfc;"
| 1978-11-05|| Win ||align=left| Cheernarong Singkongka|| Rajadamnern Stadium || Bangkok, Thailand || Decision || 5 || 3:00 
|-
! style=background:white colspan=9 |
|-
| colspan=9 | Legend:

References

External links
 
CHAMUAKPETCH HAPALANG from Lumpinee Stadium

1963 births
Living people
Chamuekpet Hapalang
Chamuekpet Hapalang
Chamuakpetch Haphalung
Flyweight kickboxers
Bantamweight kickboxers
Featherweight kickboxers
Chamuekpet Hapalang
Featherweight boxers
Thai expatriate sportspeople in Japan